Bent Løfqvist-Hansen (born 26 February 1936) is a Danish former footballer who played at both professional and international levels as a striker.

Career

Club
Løfqvist played club football in Denmark for B 1913 and OB, and in France for FC Metz. He was top scorer of the 1962 European Cup, scoring a total of seven goals in the competition.

International
He also earned one cap for the Danish national side in 1961.

References

External links
 

1936 births
Living people
Danish men's footballers
Denmark international footballers
FC Metz players
Association football forwards
Boldklubben 1913 players
UEFA Champions League top scorers